"Susan Flowers" is a single by Canadian country music artist Dick Damron. Released in 1977, it was the second single from his album A Thousand Songs of Glory. The song reached number one on the RPM Country Tracks chart in Canada in August 1977.

Chart performance

References

1977 singles
Dick Damron songs
1977 songs
Songs written by Dick Damron